His Honour Judge John Geoffrey Ramon Owen Jones (14 September 1928 – 14 June 2014) was a British judge.

Early life and education
Jones was born in Burry Port, Carmarthenshire, on 14 September 1928. He was the eldest of three sons born to Wyndham Christopher Jones, a wartime telecommunications expert at RAE Farnborough, and Lilias  Rosalind Christina John. Through his mother, Jones was a nephew of the actor Mervyn Johns and a cousin of actress Glynis Johns.

Jones was first educated at St Michael's School, an independent boarding school in Llanelli where he was Head Boy. He received his LL.B. in 1955 after graduating from the University of Wales Trinity Saint David and University College London. He received his LL.M in 1985.

Jones was called to the Bar at Gray's Inn in 1956. He was a pupil of His Honour Geraint Rees and the Right Honourable Sir John Dexter Stocker.

Career
Jones practiced law in Leicester from 1958 to 1970 and in London from 1970. On 14 January 1975, he was sworn in by the Lord Chancellor as a circuit judge, assigned to the Midland and Oxford circuit and sitting at the Central Criminal Court "Old Bailey". As a Deputy High Court Judge, Jones presided over the county courts of Leicester and Lincoln. With Jones presiding, the Crown Court of Leicester reported greater productivity. It was said that under "His Honour Judge Jones, [the court] actively encourages the co-operation of solicitors."

Mental health judiciary
From 1985 to 2000, Jones served as president of the Mental Health Review Tribunal for England and Wales, and from 1996 to 1999, he was chairman of the Mental Health Review Tribunal for Wales.

Jones' views on child psychopathy – as it relates to criminal deeds – were not to distinguish them from similar deeds committed by adults. Barring those aged 10 or younger (whom Jones said are "irrebuttably presumed not to be capable of criminal intent") and between 10 and 14 years old (where "there is only a rebuttable presumption that they are not so capable"), he believed that children are innocent only through a lack of comprehension of the wickedness of their deeds, saying "bad deeds by children horrify more than bad deeds by adults because we have the romantic and comfortable notion that children are innocent." To Jones, this was an insight into the psychopathy of adults: "An adult who does evil acts is either one who is still a child and cannot understand the evil nature of his acts, an adult who has become disinhibited, or one who has never become inhibited."

Jones subscribed to the ancient theory of Social Contract, which he called "an aspect of the instinct for self-preservation." He believed all humans to be innately self-centred, inflicting their wills on the Universe as an "inner compulsion," that we recognise the mutual benefits of society and are inhibited by virtue. Jones saw the committer of bad deeds as the impervious person: that "rare person whose intuition is stunted and who misses out on instruction grows up uninhibited, so continues bad deeds." Becoming mentally ill, a disinhibited person who once had inhibitions will also commit bad deeds; Jones resolved that they too are in need of treatment. Those who aren't in need of treatment, and guilty, are those who exercise their free will and become disinhibited by conviction. Rather than the court, Jones concluded it was the psychiatrist's job to diagnose mental health.

Jones believed strongly in fair sentencing for criminals without mental health problems. In the case of the mentally ill, he believed the welfare system was inept. In the case of a twenty-one-year-old schizophrenic accused of burglary and assault, Jones reflected that "The welfare system is not in a position to look after him. This is a grave reflection on our caring society." Addressing the man directly, he said, "I am very sorry that you are in the position you are in. On behalf of the society in which you live I am distressed that we cannot look after you."

Personal life
On 17 July 1954, Jones married Sheila Gregory in Kensington, London. Their three sons also entered the legal profession.

He died on 14 September 2014 in Leicester, England.

Honours

Scholastic

University degrees

Honorary degrees

Honorary fellowships

References

1928 births
People from Burry Port
People educated at St Michael's School, Llanelli
Alumni of the University of Wales Trinity Saint David
Alumni of University College London
20th-century Welsh judges
British judges of international courts and tribunals
Members of Gray's Inn
2014 deaths